Yasreen Begum is a Fijian footballer who plays as a forward. She has been a member of the Fiji women's national team.

Club career
Begum has played for Nadi FC in Fiji.

International career
Begum capped for Fiji at senior level during the 2010 OFC Women's Championship.

References

Year of birth missing (living people)
Living people
Fijian women's footballers
Women's association football forwards
Nadi F.C. players
Fiji women's international footballers
Fijian people of Indian descent